Pierre DuPont may refer to:

Pierre DuPont (carpet maker) (1560–1640), founder of French carpet making 
Pierre Samuel du Pont de Nemours (1739–1817), French-American entrepreneur and founder of the du Pont family dynasty
Pierre Dupont de l'Étang (1765–1840), French general
Pierre Dupont (1821–1870), French songwriter
Pierre S. du Pont (1870–1954), Du Pont Company and General Motors executive
Pierre S. du Pont IV (born 1935), American lawyer and politician, Governor of Delaware
Pierre Dupont (Tomb Raider), fictional character from the Tomb Raider video game series